Vasile Baghiu (born 1965) is a Romanian poet and writer. He was born in Borlești, Neamț County. He has published many volumes of poetry and fiction till date. His work is influenced by his early career as a nurse in a TB sanatorium, and is known for coining the poetic concept of 'chimerism'. In 1998, he published the prison memoirs of his father who had spent time in Soviet POW camps.

Baghiu now lives and works as a psychologist in Piatra Neamț. He is a member of the Romanian branch of PEN. His work has appeared in English translation in different magazines and anthologies abroad such as Banipal, Cordite Poetry Review, Magma Poetry, Penmen Review. The Aalitra Review.

Works
 1994: Gustul înstrăinării (The Alienation's Taste, poems), Timpul, Iași
 1996: Rătăcirile doamnei Bovary (Madame Bovary's Wanderings, poems), Eminescu, Bucharest
 1996: Febra (The Fevre, poems), Panteon, Piatra Neamț
 1998: Maniera (The Manner, poems), Pontica, Bucharest
 2001: Fantoma sanatoriului (The Sanatorium's Ghost, anthology, poems), Vinea, Bucharest
 2003: Himerus Alter în Rheinland (Himerus Alter in Rheinland, poems), Vinea, Bucharest
 2004: Punctul de plecare (The Starting Point, short stories), Compania, Bucharest
 2006: Ospiciul (The Hospice, novel), Vinea, Bucharest
 2008: Cât de departe am mers (Haw Far Have We Gone, poems), Limes, Cluj
 2011: Magia elementara (Elementary Magic, anthology, poems), Dacia XXI, Cluj
 2011: Gustul înstrainarii (The Alienation's Taste, anthology, selected poems), Tipo Moldova, Iași
 2012: Depresie (Depression, poems), Limes, Cluj
 2012: Planuri de viaţă (Plans in Life, novel), Polirom, Iași
 2014: Fericire sub limite (Happiness under Limits, novel), Charmides, Bistrița
 2019: Metode simple de încetinire a timpului (Simple Methods to Slow Down Time, poems), Eikon, Bucharest

Prizes
 1994: „Aurel Dumitrascu“ Prize for the collection of poems "Gustul înstrăinării" (The Alienation's Taste)
 1995: Prize of the magazin Poesis for the best literary debut
 1998: Prize of the magazine Poesis for literary critique
 2007: Prize of the Romanian Writers’ Union (Jassy), for the novel „Ospiciul“ (The Hospice)
 2013: Prize “Mihai Ursachi” for the poetry collection “Depression”
 2012: Prize “Liviu Rebreanu” (Bistrita), for the novel „Planuri de viata" (Plans in Life“

Literary Residencies/Grants
 2002: Heinrich-Böll-Haus Langenbroich (Germany)
 2003: Künstlerdorf Schöppingen (Germany) 
 2006: Kulturkontakt Austria, Vienna (Austria)
 2006: Cove Park (Scotland)
 2006: Künstlerwohnung Chretzeturm, Stein am Rhein (Switzerland)
 2011: Villa Sträuli, Winterthur (Switzerland)

References

Romanian poets
1965 births
Living people